was a feudal domain under the Tokugawa shogunate of Edo period Japan, located in Tanba Province in what is now the central portion of modern-day Kyoto Prefecture. It was centered around Sonobe jin'ya, which was located in the Sonobe neighborhood of what is now the city of Nantan, Kyoto.

History
In 1619, Koide Yoshichika, the 3rd daimyō of Izushi Domain returned the domain to his elder brother (who had been daimyō of Kishiwada Domain, and was given the newly created fief of Sonobe, with a  kokudaka of 29,800 koku. He built Sonobe jin'ya, the castle town and completed various irrigation and land improvement works. On his retirement, he took 5000 koku of the domain, reducing its kokudaka to 25,000 koku (as 500 koku had been added through the opening of new rice fields). On his death, this 5000 koku portion was divided between the two younger brothers of the 2nd daimyō, Koide Fusatomo. The 4th daimyō, Koide Fusasada, served as Jisha-bugyō and wakadoshiyori in the shogunal administration, notwithstanding his clan's status as a tozama daimyō. He also reduced the domain to 24,000 koku by ranting 1000 koku to his younger brother. The 5th daimyō, Koide Fusayoshi, also served as jisha-bugyō and wakadoshiyori. However, during the tenure of the 7th daimyō, Koide Fusatake, the domain suffered from repeated natural disaster, including flooding, crop failure and famine, which ruined the clan's financial resources. The increase in price and taxes led to a widespread revolt in 1787, which was worsened by a fire which destroyed most of the town. The domain implemented a monopoly system on tobacco and lumber, which helped alleviate its financial problems. During the Bakumatsu period, under its  final daimyō, Koide Fusanao, the domain was one of the first to side with the imperial cause. As such, it was selected by the Meiji government to be a place of refuge for Emperor Meiji in the event that Kyoto be attacked during the Boshin War, and the domain was authorized to reconstruct its jin'ya into a Japanese castle, the last to be built.  Following the Meiji restoration he was made viscount (shishaku) in the kazoku peerage.  In 1871, with the abolition of the han system, Sonobe Domain became "Sonobe Prefecture". and subsequently became part of Kyoto Prefecture.

Holdings at the end of the Edo period
Most domains in the han system, which consisted of several discontinuous territories calculated to provide the assigned kokudaka, based on periodic cadastral surveys and projected agricultural yields.

Tanba Province 
52 villages in Kuwada District
125 villages in Funai District
9 villages in Ikaruga District

List of daimyō 

{| class=wikitable
! #||Name || Tenure || Courtesy title || Court Rank || kokudaka 
|-
|colspan=6|  Koide clan, 1619 - 1871 (Tozama)
|-
||1||||1619 - 1667||Ise-no-kami (伊勢守)|| Junior 5th Rank, Lower Grade (従五位下)||29,500 koku
|-
||2||||1667 - 1673||Shinano-no-kami (信濃守)|| Junior 5th Rank, Lower Grade (従五位下)||25,000 koku
|-
||3||||1673 - 1705||Ise-no-kami (伊勢守)|| Junior 5th Rank, Lower Grade (従五位下)||25,000 koku
|-
||4||||1705 - 1744||Shinano-no-kami (信濃守)|| Junior 5th Rank, Lower Grade (従五位下)||25,000 ->24,000 koku
|-
||5||||1744 - 1767||Shinano-no-kami (信濃守)|| Junior 5th Rank, Lower Grade (従五位下)||24,000 koku
|-
||6||||1767 - 1775||Ise-no-kami (伊勢守)|| Junior 5th Rank, Lower Grade (従五位下)||24,000 koku
|-
||7||||1775 - 1821||Ise-no-kami (伊勢守)|| Junior 5th Rank, Lower Grade (従五位下)||24,000 koku
|-
||8||||1821 - 1843||Yamato-no-kami (大和守)|| Junior 5th Rank, Lower Grade (従五位下)||24,000 koku
|-
||9||||1843 - 18561||Shinano-no-kami (信濃守)|| Junior 5th Rank, Lower Grade (従五位下)||24,000 koku
|-
|10||||1856 - 1871||Ise-no-kami (伊勢守)|| Junior 5th Rank, Upper Grade (従五位上)||24,000 koku
|-
|}

See also 
 List of Han
 Abolition of the han system

Further reading
 Bolitho, Harold. (1974). Treasures Among Men: The Fudai Daimyo in Tokugawa Japan. New Haven: Yale University Press.  ;  OCLC 185685588

References

Domains of Japan
1871 disestablishments in Japan
States and territories disestablished in 1871
Tanba Province
History of Kyoto Prefecture